Claude Ollier (17 December 1922 – 18 October 2014) was a French writer closely associated with the nouveau roman literary movement. Born in Paris, he was the first winner of the Prix Médicis which he received for his novel La Mise en scène.

Ollier died on 18 October 2014, according to his publisher. He was 91.

Works
La Mise en scène (1958)
Le Maintien de l'ordre (Law and Order) (1961)
Eté indien (1963)
L'Échec de Nolan (1967)
Navettes (1967)
La Vie sur Epsilon (1972)
Marrakch Medine (1980)
Une histoire illisible (1986)
Déconnection (Disconnection) (1988)
Feuilleton (1990)
Du fond des âges (1991)
Truquage en amont (1992)
Outback ou l'arrière-monde (1995)
Cité de mémoire (1996)
Aberration (1997)
Des événements entre œil et toile (1997)
Missing (1998)
Obscuration (1999)
Wanderlust et les Oxycèdres (2000)
Quartz (2000)
Préhistoire (2001)
Navettes (2002)
Niellures (2002)
Réminiscence (1980–1990) (2003)
Qatastrophe (2004)
Wert et la vie sans fin (Wert and the Life Without End) (2007)
Cahier des fleurs et des fracas (2009)
Hors-Champ (2009)
Simulacre (2011)
Cinq contes fantastiques (2013)

References

External links
Biography and bibliography (in French)
A Conversation with Claude Ollier

1922 births
2014 deaths
Writers from Paris
20th-century French novelists
21st-century French novelists
Prix Médicis winners
Prix France Culture winners
French male novelists
20th-century French male writers
21st-century French male writers